Lopharia cinerascens is a species of crust fungus in the family Polyporaceae. It was first described by botanist Lewis David de Schweinitz in 1832 as Thelephora cinerascens. Gordon Herriot Cunningham transferred it to Lopharia in 1956. It is widely distributed in Africa, Asia, Australasia, and North America; it is less common in Europe and South America.

References

Fungi described in 1832
Fungi of Africa

Fungi of Asia
Fungi of Australia
Fungi of Europe
Fungi of New Zealand
Fungi of North America
Fungi of South America
Polyporaceae
Taxa named by Lewis David de Schweinitz